Porto Rafti, officially named Limin Markopoulou, is a seaside resort town located in East Attica, Greece.

Porto Rafti's main source of income is tourism and winemaking. It is part of the municipality of Markopoulo Mesogaias. In the 2011 census data, its permanent population was 9,686. Today, the permanent population is believed to be closer to 15,000, peaking at 100,000 every year during the summer season.

Geography 

The town of Porto Rafti stretches amphitheatrically around the Rafti Bay, a bay of the Aegean Sea, on the east coast of the Attica peninsula. It is surrounded by pine-cladded hills, the tallest of which is Merenta, 613 m above sea level. It is 5 km south of Vravrona, 6 km east of Markopoulo and 26 km southeast of the center of Athens.

Climate

Porto Rafti has a hot-summer Mediterranean climate (Köppen climate classification: Csa). Porto Rafti experiences hot, dry summers and mild winters.

History 
The port was a major trading place until the collapse of the Roman Empire. The names of the ancient villages around the bay of Porto Rafti were Steiria, Prasiai, and Koroni. They belonged to the paraktia (seaside) Pandionis phyle, according to the division of the Ancient Athenian Democracy by Clisthenes in the early 5th century BCE. 
The port of Porto Rafti is no longer in use as a commercial harbor due to environmental concerns, but it has an organized marina for smaller recreational vessels with seaside restaurants and cafes. This port was the scene of the allied troops' evacuation after the German invasion in Greece at the end of April 1941.

Churches 
"St. Spiridonos Church" Greek Orthodox Church which is situated on south end of Piratis Mountain, just on the coast of a major beach, Agios Spyridonas, that is named after the church. It is one of the oldest churches in the area.

"Agia Marina Church" Greek Orthodox Church is another scenic seaside church, on the other side of Porto Rafti. Again, the beach, Agia Marina, is named after the church.

Tourism 

Porto Rafti attracts visitors as a seaside resort, with beaches at Agios Spyridonas, Erotospilia and Avlaki, and an organized municipal beach at Avlaki.

Historic population

References

External links 

 News & Events
 Informational Article on Porto Rafti
 News
 Picture of the statue on Rafti island

Populated places in East Attica
Bays of Greece
Mediterranean port cities and towns in Greece
Landforms of East Attica
Landforms of Attica